Gert Eg (born 26 February 1954) is a Danish former footballer. He played his entire career for Vejle Boldklub and holds the club record for most played matches. He was an allrounder that could cover almost any position on the field. However, he was primarily known as an elegant and clever central defender with a great understanding of the game.

Biography 
Eg made 509 appearances for Vejle Boldklub's first team and was part of many great triumphs in the 1970s and 1980s. In a long period of time he was the team's captain.

In 1975 Eg was the matchwinner as Vejle Boldklub won the Danish Cup. Thus, VB qualified for the UEFA Cup Winners Cup, where the team made it to the quarter finals.

In 1983 Eg decided to end his footballing career, but already in 1984 he was back and became very successful once again. The same season Vejle Boldklub won its fifth Danish Championship with Eg and Allan Simonsen as some of the biggest profiles in the team.

Honours
Vejle Boldklub
The Danish Championship: 1978, 1984
The Danish Cup: 1975, 1977, 1981

External links 
Vejle Boldklub statistics

1954 births
Living people
Danish men's footballers
Association football central defenders
Vejle Boldklub players